Tholurna is a genus of lichenized fungi in the family Caliciaceae. The genus is monotypic, containing the single species Tholurna dissimilis. This species was first described by Johannes Musaeus Norman as Podocratera dissimilis in 1861; he circumscribed the new genus Tholurna the same year to contain the species. It is found in Scandinavia and western North America.

References

Caliciales
Lichen genera
Caliciales genera
Taxa described in 1861
Monotypic Lecanoromycetes genera